Thaumastus flori is a species of  tropical air-breathing land snail, a pulmonate gastropod mollusk in the family Megaspiridae.

Distribution 
 southern Ecuador. The type locality is Machala.
 Peru

Description 
Variability of shells:

See also 
 Thaumastus hartwegi (Pfeiffer, 1846) is a species with a similar shell.

References

Megaspiridae
Gastropods described in 1897